Amphibious Fighters is a 1943 short directed by Jack Eaton. In 1944, it won an Oscar for Best Short Subject (One-Reel) at the 16th Academy Awards.

Cast
 Ted Husing as himself, Narrator

References

External links

1943 films
1943 short films
American short films
Paramount Pictures short films
Live Action Short Film Academy Award winners
1940s English-language films